Pseneo is a genus of aphid wasps in the family Crabronidae. There are more than 20 described species in Pseneo.

Species
These 27 species belong to the genus Pseneo:

 Pseneo argentina (Brèthes, 1910)
 Pseneo auratus (van Lith, 1959)
 Pseneo aureolus (van Lith, 1975)
 Pseneo aurifrons (Taschenberg, 1875)
 Pseneo auriger (van Lith, 1975)
 Pseneo auriventris (van Lith, 1975)
 Pseneo canalicus (van Lith, 1975)
 Pseneo claviventris (Cameron, 1891)
 Pseneo collantes Genaro & Alayo, 2001
 Pseneo cooperi (van Lith, 1975)
 Pseneo eliasi (van Lith, 1975)
 Pseneo exaratus (Eversmann, 1849)
 Pseneo funicularius (van Lith, 1975)
 Pseneo garcesii Genaro & Alayo, 2001
 Pseneo joergenseni (Brèthes, 1913)
 Pseneo leytensis R. Bohart & Grissell, 1969
 Pseneo longiventris (Cameron, 1891)
 Pseneo madecassus (Arnold, 1945)
 Pseneo magnificus (van Lith, 1975)
 Pseneo minidentatus (van Lith, 1975)
 Pseneo multipunctatus (van Lith, 1959)
 Pseneo nigripes (van Lith, 1975)
 Pseneo punctatus (W. Fox, 1898)
 Pseneo simplicicornis (W. Fox, 1898)
 Pseneo taschenbergi (van Lith, 1975)
 Pseneo townesi (van Lith, 1959)
 Pseneo tridentatus (van Lith, 1959)

References

Crabronidae
Articles created by Qbugbot